Petropolis may refer to:

Places
 Petrópolis, Rio de Janeiro, Brazil; a town about 65 km from the city of Rio de Janeiro.
 Petrópolis Municipal Nature Park
 Roman Catholic Diocese of Petrópolis
 Cathedral of Petrópolis
 Catholic University of Petrópolis
 Petrópolis Medical School
 Petrópolis Environmental Protection Area, Rio de Janeiro, Brazil
 Petropolis Railway, in the state of Rio de Janeiro, Brazil, see List of rack railways
 Petrópolis, Rio Grande do Sul, Brazil; a neighbourhood in the city of Porto Alegre
 Petropolis, the Greek and Latin name for the previous capital of Russia, Saint Petersburg.

Fictional places
 Petropolis, the fictional setting of the Nickelodeon cartoon, T.U.F.F. Puppy.

Entertainment
 Petrópolis (film), 2022 Russian film
 Petropolis, a film made by Peter Mettler and Greenpeace about Alberta's tar sands
 "Petropolis", a 1983 song by Steve Hackett off the album Bay of Kings
 Petropolis, a 2007 novel by Anya Ulinich

Other uses
 Grupo Petrópolis, a Brazilian brewery
 Treaty of Petrópolis (1903), ending the war between Brazil and Bolivia
 Petrópolis, a futsal club in Petrópolis, Rio de Janeiro, Brazil; see List of futsal clubs in Brazil
 Petrópolis line of the House of Orléans-Braganza, in the Brazilian imperial family
 SS Petropolis (1856), sister ship of the screw steamer

See also

 2022 Petrópolis floods, a natural disaster that occurred in Petrópolis, Brazil
 Nova Petrópolis, a municipality in Rio Grande do Sul, Brazil